Claude Farrer and Arthur Stanley defeated Patrick Bowes-Lyon and Herbert Wilberforce 7–5, 6–3, 6–1 in the All Comers' Final, but the reigning champions Ernest Renshaw and William Renshaw defeated Farrer and Stanley 6–3, 6–3, 4–6, 7–5 in the challenge round to win the gentlemen's doubles tennis title at the 1886 Wimbledon Championships.

Draw

Challenge round

All comers' finals

References

External links

Gentlemen's Doubles
Wimbledon Championship by year – Men's doubles